Raghunathpur is a  village, which is located in Haspura block of Aurangabad District, Bihar in India. It comes under the Purhara Panchayat. It is the largest village of the Purhara Panchayat. It belongs to Magadh division. Village north ends comprises the border of district Arwal.

According to Census 2011 information the location code or village code of Raghunathpur village is 252766.

The total geographical area of village is 178 hectares. Raghunathpur has a total population of 2,883 people. There are about 515 houses in Raghunathpur village. Daudnagar is nearest town to Raghunathpur which is approximately 30 km away.

The post office of this village is located at Piroo which is 3 km west from this village head.

Nearby village: Piroo is in west, Rampur chai is in east, Pirho is in north and Purhara (Gram Panchayat) is in south.

In 2006 & 2011 Gram Panchayat election, Mr. Furqan Khan was elected as the Head of the Panchayat (Mukhiya) of the village (Gram panchayat-Purhara) and Mr. Raj Kumar was elected in 2016 for the Mukhiya.

Raghunathpur village is the peaceful village, because of the brotherhood among the different sections and religions of the society.

It is the good place for healthy life because of natural climates and also good for agriculture. Agriculture is the backbone of the economy of this village. Farmers play an important role in this area to maintain the development in the field of agriculture. Agricultural activities have been made easy because of the availability of electricity, road transportation and well equipped canal system in the village and its reduce the overall cost.

There is an Eidgah, a Mosque, a Temple are available for religions worship , a Library is available for young generation to prepare for general services exam and a big playground is available for cricket, football and for outdoor games. Every year a football trophy named "Aurangzeb & Rizwan Khan Memorial Trophy" is organized by Millat Committee Raghunathpur on the occasion of 'Makar Sankranti'. In 2021, this football trophy match was sponsored by Arman electronics, Haspura. 

There are two government schools and two private schools are well established for primary education. Private school names are Junior St. Michael School (JSMS) & Magadh School (A newly established) are run by private players.

Villages in Aurangabad district, Bihar